Cathedral Caverns State Park is a public recreation area and natural history preserve located in Kennamer Cove, Alabama, approximately  northeast of Grant and  southeast of Woodville in Marshall County. The park, first known as Bats Cave, was developed as a tourist attraction in the 1950s. Cathedral Caverns was declared a National Natural Landmark in 1972 and opened as a state park in 2000.

Description
Some  have been surveyed and explored; only experienced cavers are allowed to go beyond the developed trail. The cave system laid claim to many world records in its commercial heyday though their accuracy has been disputed.

Features
Notable features of the caverns include:
 Mystery River, which flows through the cavern and due to limited outflow may cause flooding after heavy rain.

History
Archaeological excavations at the mouth of Cathedral Caverns have indicated occupation by Native Americans as recently as 200 years ago and perhaps as early as 7000 BCE.

The area around the caverns was settled by the Kennamer family and became known as Kennamers Cove. During the Civil War, the Kennamer family lived in the cave for an extended period of time after their farmhouse was burned down by Union soldiers.

The cave was maintained as a tourist attraction by Jacob "Jay" Gurley from 1955 to 1974. It was sold at auction in 1975 to Tom German, who in turn sold it to the State of Alabama in 1987. After funding delays, the state began restoration work in 1995. The cavern was re-opened to the public as Cathedral Caverns State Park in May 2000.

Awards 
In September 2020, Cathedral Caverns State Park was one of eleven Alabama State Parks awarded Tripadvisor’s Traveler’s Choice Award, which recognizes businesses and attractions that earn consistently high user reviews.

Activities and amenities
The park offers cave tours, gem mining, and facilities for picnicking. The park has improved, primitive, and backcountry camping sites.

In popular culture
The caverns appear in two motion pictures: in 1983, principal photography for the horror film Secrets of the Phantom Caverns took place there; and in 1995, they provided cave settings for the Disney film Tom and Huck.

References

External links

Cathedral Caverns State Park Alabama Department of Conservation and Natural Resources

State parks of Alabama
Protected areas of Marshall County, Alabama
Archaeological sites in Alabama
Caves of Alabama
Show caves in the United States
Limestone caves
National Natural Landmarks in Alabama
Former populated places in Alabama
Landforms of Marshall County, Alabama